Following is a list of notable 3D modeling software, computer programs used for developing a mathematical representation of any three-dimensional surface of objects, also called 3D modeling.

See also
 List of computer-aided design editors
 List of 3D computer graphics software
 List of 3D animation software
 List of 3D rendering software

3d Modelling Software
3D graphics software
Software